Agnes B. Fogo is a professor of renal pathology at the Vanderbilt University Medical Center.

Biography
Fogo graduated from the University of Oslo, Norway, and the University of Tennessee, USA. She completed her M.D. from Vanderbilt University School of Medicine before going on to do residency and a fellowship in renal pathology.

Appointments
Fogo works at the Vanderbilt University Medical Center and is the John L. Shapiro Professor of Pathology, Microbiology and Immunology, Professor of Medicine and Pediatrics, and director of the Renal/Electron Microscopy Laboratory.

In 2021 she also became the International Society of Nephrology president for a 2 year term.

Awards
2011 Robert G. Narins award from the American Society of Nephrology for "substantial accomplishments in the development and leadership of educational courses and resources"
2019 Roscoe R. Robinson award from the International Society of Nephrology

Publications

Selected journal articles
 The classification of glomerulonephritis in systemic lupus erythematosus revisited, Kidney International, 65, 2, February 2004, p521-530, 
 Banff 07 Classification of Renal Allograft Pathology: Updates and Future Directions, American Journal of Transplantation, 8, 4, April 2008, p753-760, 
 Renal histopathological analysis of 26 postmortem findings of patients with COVID-19 in China, Kidney International, 98, 1, July 2020, p219-227,

Books

References

External links

Living people
Year of birth missing (living people)
Vanderbilt University staff
University of Tennessee alumni
University of Oslo alumni
Women pathologists